Banstead Athletic Football Club is a football club based in Tadworth, near Epsom in Surrey, England. They are affiliated to the Surrey County Football Association.

History
The club was established in 1944 as Banstead Juniors, before adopting their current name during the 1946–47 season. After winning the Surrey Intermediate Cup that season, the club won back-to-back league titles before moving up to the Surrey Senior League in 1949. They finished as runners-up in their first season, and went on to win the league four times in a row between 1950–51 and 1953–54, with Harry Clark scoring 81 goals in 26 games in 1950–51. The next two seasons saw them finish as runners-up to Dorking, before they won their fifth title in 1956–57. Although they finished as runners-up again for the next two seasons, the club went into decline at the start of the 1960s, and finished second-from-bottom in 1961–62.

The 1964–65 season saw Banstead win their sixth Surrey Senior League title, claiming the championship on goal average from Chobham, and they moved up to the Spartan League. When the league merged with the Metropolitan–London League in 1975, forming the London Spartan League, Banstead were placed in Division One.

In 1979 the club switched to the Athenian League, where they remained until it disbanded in 1984, winning the League Cup in 1980–81. When the league folded most clubs (including Banstead) joining the Isthmian League, with Banstead placed in Division Two South. The league was reorganised in 1991, with the club placed in Division Two. They remained in the division until 2002 when further league reorganisation saw them moved to Division One South. Two years later another reorganisation saw them placed in Division One.

At the end of the 2005–06 season Banstead resigned from the Isthmian League and dropped into the Combined Counties League Premier Division. After finishing bottom of the division in 2011–12 they were relegated to Division One. They were Division One champions in 2016–17, earning promotion back to the Premier Division.

Honours
Spartan League
League Cup winners 1965–66
Athenian League
League Cup winners 1980–81
Combined Counties League
Division One champions 2016–17
Surrey Senior League
Champions 1950–51, 1951–52, 1952–53, 1953–54, 1956–57, 1964–65
Surrey Intermediate Cup
Winners 1946–47

Records
Highest league position: 4th in Isthmian League Division Two, 1995–96
Best FA Cup performance: Third qualifying round, 1981–82, 2000–01
Best FA Trophy performance: First round, 2003–04, 2004–05
Best FA Vase performance: Semi-finals, 1996–97
Record attendance: 1,400 vs Leytonstone, FA Amateur Cup, 1953
Most appearances: Dennis Wall
Most goals: Harry Clark

See also
Banstead Athletic F.C. players
Banstead Athletic F.C. managers

References

External links
Official website

 
Association football clubs established in 1944
1944 establishments in England
Surrey Senior League
Spartan League
Athenian League
Isthmian League
Combined Counties Football League
Football clubs in Surrey
Football clubs in England